Dane Road is a tram stop on the Altrincham Line of Greater Manchester's Metrolink light rail system. It is located on Dane Road in northern Sale, Greater Manchester, England. It opened on 15 June 1992 as part of Phase 1 of Metrolink's expansion.

History

The station originally opened on 20 July 1931 by the Manchester, South Junction and Altrincham Railway (MSJAR) and was referred to as Dane Road (Sale) on early tickets and timetables. It was operated as a four-platform station from opening until 1963. Dane Road closed as a British Rail station on 24 December 1991 for conversion to Metrolink operation, where it reopened for Metrolink service on 15 June 1992.

Services
Dane Road is on the Altrincham Line, with trams towards Altrincham stopping every 6 minutes during the day, Monday to Saturday, every 12 minutes Monday to Saturday evenings and Sundays. Trams also head towards Manchester and Bury, with the Monday to Saturday daytime service running every 12 minutes each to Piccadilly or Bury, while evening and Sunday journeys run to Piccadilly only.

Service pattern 
10 trams per hour to Altrincham (5 off-peak)
5 trams per hour to Bury (peak only)
5 trams per hour to Piccadilly

Ticket zones 
As of January 2019, Dane Road is located in Metrolink ticket zone 3.

Connecting bus routes
Dane Road station is not served by any bus service, with the nearest service being Finglands/Stagecoach Manchester service 99, which stop further along Dane Road and runs to Sale and to Manchester via Northenden.

References

Further reading

External links
Dane Road Stop Information
Dane Road area map

Tram stops in Trafford
Former Manchester, South Junction and Altrincham Railway stations
Tram stops on the Altrincham to Bury line
Railway stations in Great Britain opened in 1931
Railway stations in Great Britain closed in 1991
Railway stations in Great Britain opened in 1992
Tram stops on the Altrincham to Piccadilly line
Sale, Greater Manchester